Geneva station may refer to:

Geneva station (Illinois)
Genève-Cornavin railway station in Switzerland